Catherine ("Katy") Schilly-Laetsch (October 19, 1956) is a former American long-distance runner who is a United States national champion in the marathon. Schilly attended Iowa State University where she was an All-American in track and field and cross country. At the 1984 California International Marathon, she set a course record with a time of 2:32:40. Schilly also won the 1984 San Francisco Marathon (2:35:56).

Achievements
All results regarding marathon, unless stated otherwise

References

External links
Profile at USATF Niagara Association Hall of Fame

1956 births
Living people
American female long-distance runners
Iowa State University alumni
American female marathon runners
21st-century American women